Dave Kirwan is an Australian television and radio host who works as a presenter on The Weather Channel. He was also formerly the only Australian radio announcer in New York City, the number one media market in the United States, being a DJ on CBS owned FM radio station 923-KROCK

His twelve-year media career has spanned across television, radio and voice overs.

Radio
Kirwan started his career at Sydney radio station Sea FM in 1998 before moving to the New South Wales Snowy Mountains station Snow FM. He presented a night-time nationally broadcast program for Broadcast Operations Group in 2001 before returning to Sea FM. In 2000 he was a finalist in the Rawards in the Best Program Director category.

In 2007 he commenced work with 92.3 K-ROCK in New York City presenting weekday shifts before moving to weekends.

Television
In August 2007, Kirwan was the weekend presenter on The Weather Channel. 
Kirwan was a reporter with the channel for five years before landing a presenting role hosting the popular Weekend View program.

From 2001–2004, Kirwan was the snow and surf reporter for Today on the Nine Network. He filled in for Steve Jacob's weather segments during the summer of 2005. He also made Australian television history by giving away one million dollars live on air during the program.

Other networks Kirwan has reported for include Fox Sports, FUEL TV, TV1, Sky News and MTV.

He was a reporter with NBC's national WeatherPlus network based out of New York City and weather anchor for satirical website The Onion.

In October 2009, Kirwan returned to The Weather Channel and continues with his job as a presenter of the Weekend team.

Voice Overs
Kirwan is a voice over artist being the promo voice of Nickelodeon and former promo voice for MTV.
Kirwan was chosen as the voice for HBO's Summer Heights High, which was an Australian series aired in the USA.

Other Media Work
He was the spokesperson for Perisher Blue Ski Resort during the ski season.

References and notes

External links
 WXRK profile
 EM Voices profile
 CESD Talent profile

American radio personalities
Australian television presenters
Australian radio personalities
People from Sydney
Living people
Year of birth missing (living people)